Chessgames.com is an Internet chess community with over 224,000 members. The site maintains a large database of chess games, where each game has its own discussion page for comments and analysis. Limited primarily to games where at least one player is of master strength, the database begins with the earliest known recorded games and is updated with games from current top-level tournaments. Basic membership is free, and the site is open to players at all levels of ability, with additional features available for Premium members. While the primary purpose of Chessgames.com is to provide an outlet for chess discussion and analysis, consultation games are periodically organized with teams of members playing either other teams of members or very strong masters, including a former US champion and two former world correspondence champions.

Members can maintain their own discussion pages, and there are features to assist study of openings, endgames and sacrifices. The front page also features a puzzle of the day, player of the day, and game of the day, the puzzle varying in difficulty throughout the week from "very easy" on Mondays to "insane" on Sundays.

History
Chessgames.com was founded in 2001 by Daniel Freeman and Alberto Artidiello in association with 20/20 Technologies. They developed software to integrate a chess database with a discussion forum, so that all games and players have a unique message board. The concept was immediately popular as users can kibitz (post comments) on many games and pages throughout the site. The Kramnik–Lékó World Championship 2004 match in Brissago was broadcast live on the site. This led to substantial growth in membership and interest, which has steadily increased since then due to other live events and many site enhancements.

Co-founder Alberto Artidiello died on March 1, 2015, at the age of 56.

Co-founder and longtime webmaster Daniel Freeman died on July 24, 2018, at the age of 50. The site is currently being administered on an interim basis by a user with the handle "Sargon", a longtime friend and business partner of Freeman's who had assisted him with management of the site at various times.

Database
The site's database of games was originally constructed by combining six large databases and weeding out duplicate games. The primary criterion for inclusion in the Chessgames.com database is that one of the players should be master strength (an Elo rating of 2200 or above) to reduce low quality games and erroneous fabrications. Their original goal was 750,000 games, which was their estimate of the total number of serious chess games that had been recorded up to and including 2005.  the database contains close to a million games. Each game page lists a user feedback process to eliminate bad games, help correct errors, and remove any duplicates.

Each game on Chessgames.com is hosted on a separate web page to allow internal and external weblinks to that particular game. Although other online databases may contain more games (which are not necessarily screened for quality), they typically do not permit external links to individual games or allow for kibitzing on each game. According to its webmaster, Chessgames strives for quality games without participating in the arms-race mentality that produces chess databases containing millions of questionable games.

Membership
 the site has over 270,000 registered members (of whom about 7 percent have visited over the last three months), with 5,000 new members per month. At any time, several hundred people are actively using the site. A sample of Group demographics from a 2005 questionnaire: 98 percent male, 50 percent from North America, average rating 1600–1800 with one third unrated. Members post messages under a specific username, which may be their real identity or an anonymous handle.

Prominent Chessgames.com members include former Women's World Champion Susan Polgar, former World Championship candidate Nigel Short, former 
U.S. Champion Gata Kamsky, chess authors Grandmaster Raymond Keene and FIDE Master Eric Schiller, FIDE Master Jonathan Sarfati, past USCF President Grandmaster Maxim Dlugy, International Master Lawrence Day, and Woman Grandmasters Natalia Pogonina and Yelena Dembo.  Grandmasters who have posted on Chessgames.com include Varuzhan Akobian, Rogelio Antonio Jr., Keith Arkell, Oliver Barbosa, Jayson Gonzales, Danny Gormally, Jon Ludvig Hammer, Arno Nickel, David Norwood, James Plaskett, Alejandro Ramirez, Yury Shulman, Wesley So, Mihai Suba, Gert Jan Timmerman, Tansel Turgut, Mikhail Umansky, Simon Kim Williams and Patrick Wolff.

The World
The Internet Age created the potential for one grandmaster to play against a large group ("The World") in a consultation game, starting with former World Champion Anatoly Karpov defeating The World in 1996 followed by World Champion Garry Kasparov beating The World in 1999. Since then other collections of amateurs have represented The World versus one grandmaster ("GM") with varying degrees of success. Chessgames.com began team play as The World in 2006 and defeated noted computer expert GM Arno Nickel. The group duplicated that result by winning as Black against 2007 US Champion GM Yury Shulman, and won again against the former Correspondence World Champion Gert Jan Timmerman in 2007. The Chessgames World Team drew four matches in a row: a 2008 rematch with GM Nickel, as Black in 2009 against the former ICCF World Champion Mikhail Markovich Umansky, as White in 2010 against WGM Natalia Pogonina, and as Black in 2011 against GM Varuzhan Akobian. The Chessgames.com team won a rematch as White against GM  Akobian in 2012, and won against GM Simon Kim Williams in 2013-14. The Team won their latest game in 2014 as white against GM Arkadij Naiditsch giving the team a current record of six wins, four draws, and no losses.

Instruction
Chessgames.com's stated goal for members is "to participate and learn from players stronger than [themselves], while guiding those who are weaker." The site is designed to be "a worldwide chess community where anybody from anywhere can come to discuss anything they want about chess." Many educational items are updated daily, including the Daily Puzzle, Game of the Day, Player of the Day, Opening of the Day, and Quote of the Day. Chessgames began as a chess learning site and now has a Playing Zone for real-time play. In 2005, enhanced software allowed members to embed chess diagrams in their messages, which can significantly help discuss a particular position or potential variation.

The Chessgames.com database can be searched by player, year, opening, ECO code and result. Members can create Game Collections to store hundreds of database games by any desired category, such as opening, endgame, tactic, player, or tournament. The site's kibitzing may be searched by keyword for all messages to locate previous posts and find specific information. There are more than 4 million posts.

Features
Chessgames.com has created several educational tools available to Premium (paid) members:

The Opening Explorer helps study openings move by move, to select and review games from that particular opening, while also viewing the success rate (percentage of White wins vs. draws vs. Black wins) from games in the database.
The Endgame Explorer searches for games containing specific piece configurations (king and pawn, rook and pawn, queen versus rook, etc.) to review all historical games where that endgame occurred.
The Sacrifice Explorer finds games based on sacrificed material (any pieces, exchange sacrifice, attacks on a given square, by opening, by player, etc.) to locate instructive games and puzzle examples, while helping to increase tactical skill.
The Repertoire Explorer follows a particular player's opening preferences as White and Black, simultaneously displaying that player's database games and success rate. This enables a member who desires to do so to pattern his opening play after a famous player.
Guess-the-Move is a chess training tool where members play through a database game and try to predict the following move, receiving points for correctly choosing those moves actually played.
The ChessBookie Game is a free gambling simulation using play money ("chessbucks") to predict the outcomes of games in major tournaments. Real time leaderboards track the top predictors. Winners receive various prizes, such as site memberships, gift certificates, chess books and supplies.
The Kibitzer's Café is an unrestricted, unregulated, and unmonitored forum for all registered members. It is almost entirely for non-chess discussion, and is generally devoted to American politics. It is the most used section of chessgames.com. The Ken Rogoff page is also largely political discussion with over 5700 pages of comments.

Criticism
In 2013, ChessCafe.com columnist and chess historian Olimpiu G. Urcan published an article criticising what he called the "phony scholarship" and lack of ethical standards of Chessgames.com and chess websites in general. He also criticised its close association with Raymond Keene.

Tim Harding wrote: "I would never dream of using chessgames.com as a source for any kind of historical data." Chessgames.com has also been criticized for lack of precision, rigour and sourcing by Edward Winter.

References

External links
 

Chess websites
Internet properties established in 2001
Internet chess servers